Chytridium is a genus of fungi in the family Chytridiaceae.

With the culture and characterization of Chytridium olla, the type species of the order, the limits of the Chytridiales were established.

 Names brought to synonymy
 Chytridium (Olpidium) Braun 1856, a synonym for Olpidium

References 

 Karling JS. (1971). On Chytridium Braun, Diplochytridium n. g. and Canteria n. g. (Chytridiales). Archiv für Mikrobiologie. volume 76, pages 126–131, 
 Alexander Braun, 1856: Über Chytridium, eine Gattung einzelliger Schmarotzergewächse auf Algen und Infusorien (On Chytridium, a genus of unicellular parasites on algae and infusoria)

External links 
 

 

Chytridiomycota genera